The Covington Fire Department (CFD) provides fire protection and emergency medical services for the city of Covington, Kentucky.The department serves a population of 40,640 people across an area of .The Covington Fire Department is the largest in Northern Kentucky.

Stations & Apparatus

Covington FD stations and apparatus.

Union representation
Since 1918, the Covington Fire Department has been represented by Covington Professional Firefighters Local 38, a member union of the International Association of Firefighters. Covington FD was a charter member of the IAFF.

References

External links
Covington Fire Department
Covington IAFF Website
Listing of Covington Fire apparatus

Fire departments in Kentucky